Marin Moraru (31 January 1937 – 21 August 2016) was a Romanian stage, film and television actor.

He graduated from the Caragiale Academy of Theatrical Arts and Cinematography in 1961. Moraru performed at the Youth Theatre (1961–1964), Comedy Theatre (1965–1968), Bulandra Theatre (1968–1971) and National Theatre (1971–1974). In 2009, he received the Gopo Award for Lifetime Achievement.

Moraru died on the 21st of August, 2016 at 05:30 pm at the age of 79.

Filmography  

 Haiducii (1966)
 Un film cu o fată fermecătoare (1966)
 Maiorul și moartea (1967)
 Răzbunarea haiducilor (1968)
 Felix și Otilia (1972) - Costache Giurgiuveanu
 Filip cel Bun (1974) - 
 A Police Superintendent Accuses (1974) - Ghiță Petrescu
 Un zâmbet pentru mai târziu (1974)  
 The Actor and the Savages (1975) - Vasile
 Elixirul tinereții (1975)  
 Toamna bobocilor (1975) - Toderaș
 Operațiunea Monstrul (1976) - Corneliu
 Tufă de Veneția (1977)
 Iarna bobocilor (1977)
 Concurs (1982)
 Faleze de nisip (1982)
 The Ring (1984)
 Zbor periculos (1984)
 Masca de argint (1985)
 Vară sentimentală (1986)
 Cuibul de viespi (1986)
 Chirița în Iași (1987)
 În fiecare zi mi-e dor de tine (1988)
 Iubire ca-n filme (2006) - Petre Varga
 Inimă de țigan (2007)
 Regina (2008) - Cristofor
 Aniela (2009) - Costică
 Iubire și Onoare (2010)
 Moștenirea (2011) - Toderaș
 Pariu cu viața (2011)
 O nouă viață (2014)

References 

1937 births
2016 deaths
Romanian male stage actors
Romanian male film actors
Romanian male television actors
Caragiale National University of Theatre and Film alumni
Burials at Bellu Cemetery